The Journal of Psychosomatic Obstetrics & Gynecology is a quarterly peer-reviewed medical journal covering research in obstetrics, gynecology, and psychosomatics that was established in 1982. The journal is published by Taylor & Francis on behalf of the International Society of Psychosomatic Obstetrics and Gynaecology.

Abstracting and indexing 
The journal is abstracted and indexed in: Current Contents/Clinical Medicine, Current Contents/Life Sciences, EMBASE/Excerpta Medica, Index Medicus/MEDLINE/PubMed, PsycINFO, Social Sciences Citation Index, and Science Citation Index. According to the Journal Citation Reports, the journal has a 2014 impact factor of 1.880.

References

External links 
 
 International Society of Psychosomatic Obstetrics and Gynaecology 

English-language journals
Obstetrics and gynaecology journals
Publications established in 1982
Psychosomatic medicine journals
Taylor & Francis academic journals
Quarterly journals